Andrei Dmitriyevich Khodykin (born 21 March 1986) is a Russian professional football coach and a former player. He works as a coach at the academy of FC Dynamo Moscow.

Club career
He played one season in the Russian Football National League for FC MVD Rossii Moscow in 2009.

External links
 Player page by sportbox.ru
 

1986 births
Living people
Russian footballers
Association football defenders
FC Kharkiv players
FK Mash'al Mubarek players
FC Arsenal Tula players
FC Tekstilshchik Ivanovo players
Uzbekistan Super League players
Russian expatriate footballers
Expatriate footballers in Ukraine
Expatriate footballers in Uzbekistan
FC MVD Rossii Moscow players
FC Sportakademklub Moscow players